In music, instrumentation is the particular combination of musical instruments employed in a composition, and the properties of those instruments individually. Instrumentation is sometimes used as a synonym for orchestration. This juxtaposition of the two terms was first made in 1843 by Hector Berlioz in his Grand traité d'instrumentation et d'orchestration modernes, and various attempts have since been made to differentiate them. Instrumentation is a more general term referring to an orchestrator's, composer's or arranger's selection of instruments in varying combinations, or even a choice made by the performers for a particular performance, as opposed to the narrower sense of orchestration, which is the act of scoring for orchestra a work originally written for a solo instrument or smaller group of instruments.

Instrumental properties
Writing for any instrument requires a composer or arranger to know the instrument's properties, such as:
 the instrument's particular timbre, or range of timbres;
 the range of pitches available on the instrument, as well as its dynamic range;
 the constraints of playing technique, such as length of breath, possible fingerings, or the average player's stamina;
 the relative difficulty of particular music on that instrument (for example, repeated notes are much easier to play on the violin than on the piano; while trills are relatively easy on the flute, but extremely difficult on the trombone);
 the availability of special effects or extended techniques, such as col legno playing, fluttertongue, or glissando; 
 the notation conventions for the instrument.

Instrumental combinations
Whereas "orchestration" refers to the deployment and combination of instruments in large ensembles, "instrumentation" is a wider term that also embraces the ingenuity of composers and arrangers in the handling of small ensembles. J. S. Bach experimented with a variety of instrumental groups throughout his composing life. A striking example is the band that he selected to accompany the solo bass singer in the "Quoniam" movement from his Mass in B minor.

According to George Stauffer, "The 'Quoniam' is one of Bach's most extraordinary arias. The setting—bass voice, horn, two bassoons and continuo—is unique in his oeuvre. Indeed, one is hard pressed to find the combination elsewhere in the Baroque repertory."

The opening bars of Beethoven's Sonata for Violin and Piano, Op. 96 demonstrate how both contrast and blend of timbres work when composing for instruments.  In bars 1-10, "the violin and piano echo one another's motifs", emphasising the contrast between their sounds.  However, in the passage that follows (bars 11-20), the two instruments blend exquisitely as they "dovetail their efforts in long, soaring, arpeggiated lines in parallel motion".  Here, the violin line is "sandwiched" between the two piano lines. "Collaborating, the instruments genially traverse an agreed route: they are of one mind; neither needs to develop a separate perspective, let alone to advocate a contending view of experience. Instead, external concord finds inner confirmation, with each instrument completing, ratifying, and reinforcing the other."

The haunting second movement of Schubert's Trio in E-flat major exemplifies the variety and interest that is possible with just three instruments. Writing of this movement Charles Rosen speaks of how Schubert "often concentrated, not on the motif, but on the space outlined by the motif, rearranging the elements within that space in different permutations." The movement opens with the main theme played on the cello with the piano providing a trudging accompaniment consisting of repeated chords:

When the theme repeats a few bars later, these roles are exchanged. The piano plays the melody in octaves, while the violin and cello play the accompaniment:

Later in the movement, the piano plays both the theme in the right hand and the accompaniment in the left, leaving the violin and cello free to provide decorative countermelodies:

The concluding bars of the movement ring the changes in instrumentation yet again, adding further ideas, such as the falling octave figure in the first and final bars, while varying and enriching the harmony and instrumental color.  The strings here accompany the piano playing pizzicato, before returning to their bows for the deeply expressive final bars:

Other works featuring distinctive instrumentation
Rossini, Petite messe solennelle (1863): twelve singers, two pianos and harmonium;
Saint-Saens, The Carnival of the Animals (1886): flute, clarinet, glockenspiel, xylophone, 2 violins, viola, cello, double bass and two pianos;
Debussy, Sonata for flute, viola, and harp (1915);
Stravinsky, The Soldier's Tale (1918): cornet, trombone, clarinet, bassoon, violin, double bass and percussion;
Schoenberg, Herzgewächse, Op. 20: song for high voice accompanied by celesta, harmonium and harp; Serenade, Op. 24: clarinet, bass clarinet, mandolin, guitar, violin, viola and 'cello.
Villa-Lobos, Chôros No. 4 (1926): three horns and trombone;
Bartók, Sonata for Two Pianos and Percussion (1937);
Messiaen,  (1937): six ondes Martenot;  (1941): clarinet, violin, cello and piano;
Stockhausen, Kreuzspiel (1951): oboe, bass clarinet, piano and four percussionists;
Cage, Imaginary Landscape No. 4 (March No. 2) (1951): 12 radios, 24 players;
Boulez, Le Marteau sans maître (1955): alto flute, viola, vibraphone, xylorimba, guitar and percussion; Sur Incises (1996–98): three pianos, three harps, and three percussionists;
Goeyvaerts, De Zang van Aquarius (The Song of Aquarius, 1984): eight bass clarinets.

See also
Concert band
Brass section
Keyboard section
Percussion section
String section
Woodwind section
Shorthand for orchestra instrumentation
Hornbostel–Sachs instrument classification system

References

Bibliography

Further reading

 Berlioz, Hector (1948). Treatise on Instrumentation, Enlarged and Revised by Richard Strauss, Including Berlioz' Essay "On Conducting", translated by Theodore Front. New York: E. F. Kalmus.
 
 
 
  (Reprint New York: Haskell House, 1969)

External links
; Schubert: Piano Trio No. 2 in E-flat major, Trio Wanderer

Musical instruments
Music theory